Nabil Taïder (born 26 May 1983) is a former professional footballer who played as a defensive midfielder. Born in France, he made four international appearances for Tunisia, scoring one goal.

Personal life
Taïder was born in France to a Tunisian father and an Algerian mother of Kabyle descent. His younger brother, Saphir Taïder, is also a professional footballer.

Club career
Taïder began his career in the youth ranks of Toulouse FC. In 2001, he was promoted to the senior side and went on to be a key player in the midfield for the French side. In six years at the club Taïder appeared in 144 league matches and score 4 goals. During the 2006–07 season he was loaned to FC Lorient and appeared in 11 matches and score one goal. The following season he went on loan to Stade de Reims and was a key player for the club appearing in 24 league matches and scoring 3 goals. In 2008, he left France and joined Greece's Skoda Xanthi. In his first year with Skoda Xanthi, Taïder played in 24 matches and scored two goals. His second year in Greece saw him feature less frequently. As a result, he left the club during the winter transfer period.

On 8 January 2010, Sivasspor signed the Tunisian midfielder in a -year deal. While with Sivasspor, Taïder appeared in 8 league matches. He was released on 8 September 2010.

On 19 April 2011, Taider appeared in a reserve game for Championship side Bristol City. Nabil played an hour in a 2–1 defeat against Yeovil Town. Taïder joined Tunisian club Étoile Sportive du Sahel on 27 January 2012.

Taïder joined ND Gorica on 30 August 2013 in a temporary deal, the paper was completed on 5 September 2013. Taïder was signed by Parma F.C. from Calcio Como on a free transfer on 21 August 2013.

On 20 October 2014 Taïder re-joined Novi Gorica in a 1-year contract.

International career
In 2005, at the age of 21, he attempted to join the Tunisia national football team for the 2006 FIFA World Cup, however FIFA deemed him ineligible as he had played for France U21, as opposed to the Tunisia national football team, before the age of 21. In 2009, he was finally able to debut for Tunisia. On 6 September 2009 he scored his first goal with Tunisia in a 2–2 draw against Nigeria.

International goal
Score and result list Tunisia goal tally first, score column indicates score after Taïder goal.

References

External links

1983 births
Living people
People from Lavaur, Tarn
Sportspeople from Tarn (department)
Berber Tunisians
French footballers
Tunisian footballers
Tunisian people of Algerian descent
French people of Kabyle descent
French sportspeople of Tunisian descent
Footballers from Occitania (administrative region)
France under-21 international footballers
Tunisia international footballers
Association football midfielders
Toulouse FC players
FC Lorient players
Slovenian PrvaLiga players
Stade de Reims players
Xanthi F.C. players
Sivasspor footballers
Étoile Sportive du Sahel
ND Gorica players
FC Lokomotiv 1929 Sofia players
Toulouse Rodéo FC players
Blagnac FC players
Ligue 1 players
Ligue 2 players
Championnat National players
Championnat National 2 players
Championnat National 3 players
Süper Lig players
Super League Greece players
First Professional Football League (Bulgaria) players
French expatriate footballers
Tunisian expatriate footballers
Tunisian expatriate sportspeople in Greece
French expatriate sportspeople in Greece
Expatriate footballers in Greece
Tunisian expatriate sportspeople in Turkey
French expatriate sportspeople in Turkey
Expatriate footballers in Turkey
French expatriate sportspeople in Slovenia
Expatriate footballers in Slovenia
Tunisian expatriate sportspeople in Bulgaria
French expatriate sportspeople in Bulgaria
Expatriate footballers in Bulgaria